Excilia Saldaña (7 August 1946 – 20 July 1999) was an Afro-Cuban juvenile literature writer, poet and academic. In 1984, she won the National Union of Writers and Artists of Cuba Special Prize La Rosa Blanca given for the best children's literature of the year for the first time and repeated that award four other times in her career. In 1995, she was a finalist in the International José Martí Prize for children's Literature awarded by the Costa Rican Ministry of Culture and the San Judas Tadeo Foundation. Three years later, her poetry garnered her the Nicolás Guilén Award.

Biography
Excilia Saldaña Molina was born on 7 August 1946 in Havana, Cuba. She grew up with her grandmother, her teenaged mother, having been abandoned by Saldaña's father. After graduating from the Pedagogical Institute in Havana, she began work as a high school teacher. She became one of the group of writers and cultural figures who established the journal, El Caimán Barbudo (The Bearded Cayman) in 1966. Her first book of poetry Enlloró, an unpublished manuscript, won acclaim and received honorable mention in 1967 from the jury of the Casa de las Américas Prize. That same year, some of her poetry was translated into French and published in the journal Les Lettres Nouvelles. Saldaña left teaching in 1971 and began working as an editor at Editorial Casa de las Américas. The next year she became an editor  at El Caimán Barbudo and then in 1975 moved to Editorial Gente Nueva.

Saldaña taught as a visiting professor in Santa Clara at the Felize Varela Teaching Institute and several other universities teaching children's literature. She was noted for her experimental forms which straddled the boundary between prose and poetry, blending in myth, folklore and meticulously studied cultural traditions. Her poetic works  were often autobiographical or steeped in Afro-Cuban tradition, exploring the complexities of women's roles as both traditional mother and sexual being. Saldaña's poetry speaks about women's themes common in the Caribbean, abandonment, incest, sexual violence, shame, but also nurturing and redemption from other women.

Winning numerous awards throughout her career, Saldaña received the 1979 National Ismaelillo Prize from the National Union of Writers and Artists of Cuba (UNEAC) and the Rosa Blanca Prize from UNEAC in 1984. She won the Rosa Blanca Prize three years in a row in 1987, 1988 and 1989, and then again in 1995. That same year, Saldaña was a finalist in the International José Martí Prize for children's Literature awarded by the Costa Rican Ministry of Culture and the San Judas Tadeo Foundation and in 1998 she was honored with UNEAC's Nicolás Guilén Award for poetry.

Saldaña died on 20 July 1999 in Havana from complications of asthma.

Selected works

References

Citations

Sources

External links
WorldCat Publications List

1946 births
1999 deaths
Writers from Havana
Cuban people of African descent
20th-century Cuban women writers
20th-century Cuban writers
Cuban feminists
Cuban editors
20th-century Cuban educators